Air Florida was an American low-cost carrier that operated from 1971 to 1984. In 1975 it was headquartered in the Dadeland Towers in what is now Kendall, Florida in unincorporated Miami-Dade County, Florida.

Air Florida's IATA code is now used by Bamboo Airways, a Vietnamese airline.

History

Air Florida was based at Miami International Airport. It was founded in September 1971 by Miami native Eli Timoner, and was organized by company president Ted Griffin, a former marketing director of Eastern Air Lines. It initiated revenue operations on September 28, 1972, operating as an intrastate airline using two Boeing 707 jetliners purchased from Pan American World Airways and offering twice-daily service in Florida between Miami (MIA), Orlando (MCO) and St. Petersburg (PIE) on "triangle" routings of MIA-MCO-PIE-MIA and MIA-PIE-MCO-MIA with a one way introductory fare of $12.00. The airline later acquired Lockheed L-188 Electra turboprop aircraft, which replaced the Boeing 707s. Although Air Florida began operations as an intrastate air carrier flying wholly within the state of Florida, it subsequently began adding domestic and international destinations outside of the state. With this expansion, Air Florida's fleet grew to include Boeing 727-200, Boeing 737-100, Boeing 737-200, Douglas DC-8-62, Douglas DC-9-10, and McDonnell Douglas DC-10-30 jetliners.

Ed Acker, formerly CEO of Braniff International Airways, led an acquisition of Air Florida in 1975 and expanded the airline into the interstate market following the Airline Deregulation Act of 1978. In addition to having a large presence in the Northeast-to-Florida market during the 1970s and 1980s, the airline also expanded internationally and served various points in the Caribbean and Central America, as well as a number of European destinations including Amsterdam, Brussels, Düsseldorf, Frankfurt, London, Madrid, Paris, Shannon and Zurich. The European services were primarily flown with McDonnell Douglas DC-10-30 aircraft, although British Island Airways provided connecting passenger service with their British Aircraft Corporation BAC One-Eleven jets for Air Florida on some intra-European route segments with an example being London-Amsterdam. The airline also operated a leased Douglas DC-8-62 for use on transatlantic flights at one point.  Air Florida was well known for its attractive flight attendants and, on international flights, four-star cuisine. In 1981, shortly before the crash of Air Florida Flight 90, Acker left Air Florida to become the Chairman, CEO and President of Pan American World Airways (Pan Am).

Air Florida tried to buy out Western Airlines during the 1980s in order to increase its presence in the West and also to begin proposed flights to Mexico and western Canada. The negotiations with Western ended up with Air Florida owning 16 percent of the California-based company. Western was later acquired by and merged into Delta Air Lines.

The crash of Flight 90 on January 13, 1982, coupled with Air Florida's high financial leverage and reliance on foreign currency trading for profits, led the company to declare bankruptcy and cease operations on July 3, 1984, despite an effort by new head Donald Lloyd-Jones (an alumnus of American Airlines) to save the company. When operations ceased, Air Florida had over 18 months of unprocessed credit card ticket purchases and dozens of flight crews idle at home because management had failed to renew leases on their DC-10-30 aircraft. Midway Airlines acquired most of the assets of Air Florida for $53 million while the airline was in Chapter 11 bankruptcy protection.

Air Florida Commuter

Air Florida Commuter was not an airline, but a system of affiliated commuter and regional air carriers that fed traffic into Air Florida's hubs. In an arrangement commonly known as code-sharing, each airline painted their aircraft in Air Florida colors and their flights were listed in reservations systems as Air Florida flights. Air Miami became the first affiliate in 1980 and over a dozen other airlines became part of the system, including: Air Sunshine, Marco Island Airways, Florida Airlines, Key Air, Southern International, Skyway Airlines, North American Airlines, National Commuter Airlines, Gull Air, Pompano, Finair, Slocum, Atlantic Gulf, Skyway of Ocala and others. As Air Florida became financially strapped, the commuter system was dismantled in early 1984.

Sponsorship

Air Florida sponsored Southampton Football Club, an English Football League side, during the 1983-84 season, in which Southampton were league runners-up. The deal was cancelled after one season due to Air Florida's insolvency.

Destinations

Some of the above destinations in the U.S. and the Bahamas were served by commuter air carriers operating Air Florida Commuter service with prop and turboprop aircraft via respective code sharing agreements.

Air Florida also served Charleston, South Carolina; Chicago (Midway Airport), Illinois; Dallas/Ft. Worth (DFW Airport), Texas; Düsseldorf, Germany; Frankfurt, Germany; Houston (Hobby Airport), Texas; Paris, France; Madrid, Spain; Providence, Rhode Island; Savannah, Georgia; and Zurich, Switzerland with mainline jet service at various times during its existence. Air Florida Commuter also served Lakeland, Florida in early 1983.

Fleet

When Air Florida ceased all operations, the airline was operating the following mainline jet aircraft:

Retired fleet
Air Florida also operated the following aircraft in its mainline fleet, but retired these types before the demise of the airline:

BAC One-Eleven (operated by British Island Airways in Europe to provide passenger feed for Air Florida's transatlantic flights.  The aircraft had Air Florida titles in addition to their British Island Airways titles)
Boeing 707-320
Boeing 727-100
Boeing 727-200
McDonnell Douglas DC-9-15RC
Lockheed L-188C Electra (only mainline turboprop aircraft type operated by Air Florida)

Accidents and incidents
On August 10, 1980, Air Florida Flight 4, with 35 people on board, operated by a Boeing 737 from Miami International Airport to Key West International Airport, was taken over by a hijacker, who demanded to be flown to Cuba. He later surrendered in Havana.
Three days later, on August 13, 1980, Air Florida Flight 707, another Boeing 737, flying the opposite direction of Flight 4, with 74 people on board, was hijacked by seven people. They demanded to be taken to Cuba, but later surrendered.
On September 22, 1981, Air Florida Flight 2198, operated by a McDonnell-Douglas DC-10 carrying 71 occupants, suffered an uncontained engine failure after departing Miami, the aircraft returned to the airport and made a safe landing, no one was hurt.
On January 13, 1982, Air Florida Flight 90 crashed very shortly after takeoff from Washington National Airport due to atmospheric icing and pilot error, killing 74 of the 79 people on board, injuring four of the five survivors, and killing four people on the Interstate 395 14th Street Bridge, which the Boeing 737-200 crashed into before plunging into the ice covered Potomac River.
On February 2, 1982, Air Florida Flight 710, a Boeing 737-200 with 77 people on board from Miami International to Key West International was hijacked. The hijacker wanted to be taken to Cuba, but he later surrendered.
On July 7, 1983, Air Florida Flight 8 with 47 people on board was flying from Fort Lauderdale International Airport to Tampa International Airport. One of the passengers handed a note to one of the flight attendants, saying that he had a bomb, and telling them to fly the plane to Havana, Cuba. He revealed a small athletic bag, which he opened, and inside was an apparent explosive device. The airplane was diverted to Havana-José Martí International Airport, and the hijacker was taken into custody by Cuban authorities.

See also
 List of defunct airlines of the United States

References

External links

 Air Florida Systems: Air Florida
Airchive.com: Air Florida  timetable and route map images
timetableimages.com: Air Florida timetable and route map images
Sunshine Skies: Air Florida history, vintage photos and route map

 
1971 establishments in Florida
Airlines established in 1971
Airlines disestablished in 1984
Defunct airlines of the United States
Defunct companies based in Florida
Defunct low-cost airlines
1984 disestablishments in Florida
Companies that filed for Chapter 11 bankruptcy in 1984
Airlines based in Florida